Internet intermediary refers to a company that facilitates the use of the Internet. Such companies include internet service providers (ISPs), search engines and social media platforms.

Definition
According to OECD, and cited by UNESCO, Internet intermediaries can be defined as organizations (primarily, for-profit companies) that "bring together or facilitate transactions between third parties on the Internet. They give access to, host, transmit and index content, products and services originated by third parties on the Internet or provide Internet-based services to third parties" and lists the following organizations as fitting this definition:

 Internet access and service providers (ISPs);
 Data processing and web hosting providers, including domain name registrars;
 Internet search engines and portals;
 E-commerce intermediaries, where these platforms do not take title to the goods being sold;
 Internet payment systems; and
 Participative  networking  platforms, which  include  Internet  publishing  and  broadcasting platforms that do not themselves create or own the content being published or broadcast.

UNESCO study of 2014
In 2014 UNESCO released a report on the Internet intermediaries relation to digital rights worldwide. It found that Operations  of  internet  intermediaries  are  heavily  influenced  by  the  legal  and  policy  environments of states. 

According to the UNESCO study, levels of transparency of Internet service providers on matters related to privacy and surveillance are very low. Data protection practices varied widely in tandem with whether or not countries had data protection laws. Few companies make an effort to be transparent about how they respond to government requests, or speak up for their users, even in relatively open political and media environments. Some companies do not have publicly available privacy policies for their core services.

Search engines’ policies and practices related to content restriction and manipulation are shaped by their home jurisdictions and to 
varying degrees by other jurisdictions in which they operate. Without  government transparency, company transparency reports are the only way for users to ascertain the extent and nature of requests being made. While such transparency reports are presented by American Google search engine, they are not released by Russian Yandex and Chinese Baidu companies.

For the two platforms with international user bases (Facebook and Twitter), UNESCO researchers identified tensions between the companies’ own policies and practices and governments’ laws and regulations. The policies and practices of the more domestically focused platforms more closely mirror home governments’ expectations and requirements. Companies are much more transparent about how they respond to government requests than they are about the nature and volume of content restricted for violation of their own private rules. There is significant concern amongst some human rights advocates, including for example those working to stop gender-based violence and online hate speech, about companies’ lack of communication with users about how terms of service are developed, interpreted and enforced. 

UNESCO recommended that

References

Further reading
Comparative Study Of National Approaches To Internet Intermediary Liability
Internet intermediaries. Definitions, economic models and role in the value chain

Internet terminology
Telecommunications organizations